The culture of Washington, D.C. is reflected in its status as the capital of the United States and the presence of the federal government, its large Black population, and its role as the largest city in the Chesapeake Bay region. The presence of the U.S. federal government, in particular, has been instrumental in developing numerous cultural institutions throughout the city, such as museums and performing arts centers. The city's historic Black population has also helped drive cultural activities and artistic pursuits. During the early 20th century, for example, Washington's U Street Corridor became an important center for African American culture.

Museums and monuments 

Washington is home to numerous national landmarks and is one of the most popular tourist destinations in the United States. The National Mall is a large, open area in the center of the city featuring many monuments and memorials to American political and social leaders. On the west end of the mall is the Lincoln Memorial and on the east end is the United States Capitol. The Lincolnl Memorial was completed in 1922 and honors Abraham Lincoln, who was president during the American Civil War. The Lincoln Memorial has become a temple to American hopes and dreams since its opening, and has been the location of many of the country's most important protests and speeches, including Martin Luther King Jr's I Have a Dream Speech. Located prominently in the center of the Mall and rising to a height of 555 feet is the Washington Monument. Completed in 1884, this obelisk serves as a memorial to the country's first president: George Washington. Just south of this monument is the World War II Memorial. Connecting the Lincoln Memorial to the Washington Monument is the Lincoln Memorial Reflecting Pool, which has the Vietnam Veterans Memorial to its north and the Korean War Veterans Memorial to its south. 

Just south of the mall is the Tidal Basin, a man-made reservoir with rows of Japanese Cherry Trees which blossom in the spring. The blossoming of the flowers on these trees is a popular event which brings tourists from around the world as part of the annual National Cherry Blossom Festival. Notable points of interest around the Tidal Basin include the Jefferson Memorial, the Franklin Delano Roosevelt Memorial, the District of Columbia War Memorial, the Martin Luther King Jr. Memorial, and the George Mason Memorial.

The world-famous Smithsonian Institution is a collection of several museums, research center, and a zoo located throughout the city. Among the Smithsonian's museums and locations is the Anacostia Museum, Arthur M. Sackler Gallery, Hirshhorn Museum, National Museum of African American History and Culture, National Air and Space Museum, National Museum of American History, National Museum of the American Indian, National Museum of Natural History, National Portrait Gallery, National Postal Museum, Smithsonian American Art Museum, Renwick Gallery, and the National Zoo.

Other art museums in D.C. include the National Gallery of Art, National Museum of Women in the Arts, the Corcoran Gallery of Art, and the Phillips Collection.

Other memorials, monuments, museums, and notable landmarks include: the Old Post Office, the Treasury Building, Old Patent Office Building, the National Cathedral, the Basilica of the National Shrine of the Immaculate Conception, the National World War I Memorial, the Frederick Douglass National Historic Site, Lincoln's Cottage, the Dwight D. Eisenhower Memorial, and the United States Navy Memorial. The Octagon House, which was the building that President James Madison and his administration moved into following the burning of the White House during the War of 1812, is now a historic museum and popular tourist destination.

The National Archives is headquartered in a building just north of the National Mall and houses thousands of documents important to American history, including the Declaration of Independence, the Constitution, and the Bill of Rights. Located in three buildings on Capitol Hill, the Library of Congress is a library complex with a collection of more than 147 million books, manuscripts, and other materials. The United States Supreme Court is located in a building just north of the Library of Congress that was completed in 1935.

Other points of interest in Washington, D.C. include Arena Stage, Chinatown, Basilica of the National Shrine of the Immaculate Conception, Blair House, Cathedral of St. Matthew the Apostle, Folger Shakespeare Library, Ford's Theatre, the International Spy Museum, National Building Museum, National Geographic Society, Theodore Roosevelt Island, United States Holocaust Memorial Museum, and the Mount St. Sepulchre Franciscan Monastery.

Architecture 

Washington has a variety of architecture including some of the country's most recognizable and architecturally important buildings, including the White House, United States Capitol, and Thomas Jefferson Building of the Library of Congress. Among the various architectural styles found throughout the city include neoclassical, Georgian, gothic revival, brutalist, and modern. Due to the federal Height of Buildings Act of 1910, Washington's skyline is low and includes no skyscrapers.

D.C.'s architecture is widely recognizable and popular across the country, as evidenced by the fact that 8 of the top 15 structures in the American Institute of Architecture's list of America's Favorite Architecture are located in the city.

Performing arts

Washington is a major national center for the arts, with many venues for the performing arts in the city. Theater dates back to the early 19th century when a theater was established in Samuel Blodgett Jr's Great Hotel on E Street in 1800, soon after the capital was relocated to Washington, D.C. The National Theatre opened in 1835 on E Street, near the White House. DAR Constitution Hall opened in 1929, and remained the city's primary concert hall until the John F. Kennedy Center for the Performing Arts opened in 1971.

DAR Constitution Hall, National Theatre, and other venues remained segregated throughout the early part of the 20th century. Contralto Marian Anderson was barred from performing at Constitution Hall in 1939, instead performing at the Lincoln Memorial to large crowds. The U Street Corridor was the center of African American culture in Washington, D.C. The Lincoln Theatre hosted the likes of Duke Ellington and Ella Fitzgerald on U Street (known as "Washington's Black Broadway") prior to the 1968 riots.

Arena Stage, one of the first non-profit regional theaters in the nation, produces an eight-show season ranging from classics to world premieres, dedicated to the American canon of theater. The Shakespeare Theatre Company is regarded as one of the world's great Shakespeare troupes. Numerous other professional theaters, such as the Studio Theatre and Woolly Mammoth, and venues such as the National Theatre, make the city a major theater center. The Kennedy Center hosts the National Symphony Orchestra, the Washington National Opera, the Washington Ballet, and a variety of other musical and stage performances.

Notable local music clubs include Madam's Organ Blues Bar in Adams Morgan; Blues Alley in Georgetown; the Eighteenth Street Lounge in the Dupont Circle district; and the Black Cat, the 9:30 Club, the Bohemian Caverns jazz club, the Twins jazz clubs, all in the U Street NW area. The U Street area actually contains more than two dozen bars, clubs, and restaurants that feature jazz either nightly or several times a week. Notable Washingtonians in the entertainment industry include singer-songwriter Marvin Gaye, film actress Helen Hayes, comedian David Chappelle, musician Duke Ellington, filmmaker Ted Salins and two members of Jefferson Airplane: guitarist Jorma Kaukonen and bass player Jack Casady.

Music

D.C. has its own native music genre, called go-go, a post-funk, percussion-driven flavor of R&B that blends live sets with relentless dance rhythms, so-called because they "go and go and go." The most accomplished practitioner of go-go was D.C. bandleader Chuck Brown, who brought go-go to the brink of national recognition with his 1979 LP Bustin' Loose. Go-Go band and Washington natives Experience Unlimited (E.U.) hit the American pop charts in 1988 with their memorable dance tune "Da Butt" Other notable go-go bands include Rare Essence, Trouble Funk, Junkyard Band, Backyard Band, and the Northeast Groovers.

Washington was an important center in the genesis of punk rock in the United States. Punk bands of note from Washington include Tru Fax & the Insaniacs, Fugazi, Bad Brains, and Minor Threat. Washingtonians continue to support punk bands, long after the punk movement's popularity peaked. The region also has a significant indie rock history and was home to TeenBeat, Dischord Records and Simple Machines, among other indie record labels.

Washington is also home to Duke Ellington School of the Arts, founded in 1974 and part of the DC Public School System. Some other notable music education organizations which are located and founded in Washington include the DC Youth Orchestra Program founded in 1960; Blues Alley, founded in 1985; and the Levine School of Music, founded in 1976.

Television shows
There have been several television series that have featured the District. Most of these have been related to government (e.g., The West Wing, Commander in Chief, House of Cards) or security organizations (The District, Get Smart). Other programs had the nation's capital as a secondary focus, telling stories on their own that were not always tied to the infrastructure of the government either in the district or for the country. For instance, Murphy Brown focused on the lives of the reporters of the (fictional) Washington-based television newsmagazine, FYI. The soap opera Capitol allowed for stories about political intrigue alongside the traditional class struggle sagas. The sitcom 227 portrayed the life of the African American majority as seen through the eyes of residents in a Washington apartment building. There are also many movies shot and filmed in the city yearly.

Movies 
Washington, DC has been featured in many movies, most often related to politics (The American President, Wag the Dog), security organizations (Breach, Clear and Present Danger), or media (The Post, Broadcast News). The White House and other monuments on the National Mall are also featured frequently in film.

It has also hosted movie premieres, including 2001: A Space Odyssey, The Empire Strikes Back, and Interstellar.

Sports 

Other professional and semi-professional teams based in D.C. include the USAFL Baltimore Washington Eagles, the NWFA D.C. Divas, the Minor League Football D.C. Explosion, the Washington RFC rugby union team of the Rugby Super League, as well as a host of others playing in the Potomac Rugby Union and the Washington Cricket League. It was also home to the WUSA Washington Freedom, from 1987 to 1989 home of the Major Indoor Lacrosse League's Washington Wave, and during the 2000–2002 NLL seasons, the Washington Power was based in the city. In rugby league, the Washington, D.C. Slayers play in the American National Rugby League.

There were two Major League Baseball teams named the Washington Senators in the early and mid-20th century, which left to become respectively the Minnesota Twins and the Texas Rangers. In the 19th century, the town was home to teams called the Washington Nationals, Washington Statesmen, and Washington Senators on and off from the 1870s to the turn of the century.

Washington was home to several Negro league baseball teams, including the Washington Homestead Grays, Washington Black Senators, Washington Elite Giants, Washington Pilots, and Washington Potomacs.

The Capital One Arena in Chinatown, home to the Capitals, Mystics, Wizards and the Georgetown Hoyas, is also a major venue for concerts, World Wrestling Entertainment (WWE) professional wrestling, and other events, having replaced the old Capital Centre. Since its opening in 1997, the arena has served as a catalyst of prosperity in Chinatown. Office buildings, high-end condominiums, restaurant chains, movie theatres, and other luxuries have sprung up around Chinatown. On the downside, the growth has forced out many Chinatown landmarks, and only a fraction of Chinatown remains "Chinese".

The city's soccer team, D.C. United, is the most successful franchise in MLS history, with 4 league championships and 10 total tournament victories, both league highs. The city is also considered the most passionate soccer market, with a list of people including MLS Commissioner Don Garber and TV Commentator (and former US National team and MLS star) Eric Wynalda outright declaring Washington the country's best soccer market.

Washington hosts the annual Washington Open tennis tournament that takes place at the William H.G. FitzGerald Tennis Center on 17th Street in Rock Creek Park.

The Marine Corps Marathon and the National Marathon are both held annually in Washington.

Cuisine 

Washington, D.C. has a robust and vibrant food scene that has been growing in recent years.

Half-smokes are considered D.C.'s signature dish, and are popular at landmark restaurant Ben's Chili Bowl. Mumbo sauce is a D.C. area condiment and jumbo slice pizza is popular in the Adams Morgan neighborhood.

Many celebrity chefs are based out of D.C., including José Andrés, Kwame Onwuachi, Gordon Ramsay, and previously Michel Richard. Georgetown Cupcake was featured on a reality show called DC Cupcakes.

The Gin Rickey was invented in 1883 at Shoomaker's in Washington, D.C. and is D.C.'s official cocktail.

Media

Newspapers and magazines

The Washington Post is the oldest and most-read daily newspaper in Washington, and it has developed into one of the most reputable daily newspapers in the U.S. It is most notable for exposing the Watergate scandal, among other achievements. The Washington Post also has a daily free newspaper called the Express, summarizing events, sports, and entertainment. The conservative daily The Washington Times, online DCist, and free weekly Washington City Paper also have substantial readership in the District, as does the magazine Washingtonian. On February 1, 2005 the free daily tabloid Washington Examiner debuted, having been formed from a chain of suburban newspapers known as the Journal Newspapers.

The weekly Washington Blade and Metro Weekly focus on gay issues, and the Washington Informer on African American issues. Bi-weekly Street Sense focuses on issues of homelessness and poverty.

Many neighborhoods in the District have their own community newspapers, usually published on a weekly basis. Some of these include The Current Newspapers, which has editions serving Dupont Circle, Foggy Bottom, Georgetown, Chevy Chase, Upper Northwest and a Capitol Hill paper called The Capitol Hill Current/Voice of the Hill. Additional papers include In-Towner (Dupont Circle, Logan Circle, and Adams Morgan), Hill Rag (Capitol Hill), East of the River (Anacostia), and DC North (Northeast DC). In addition, several specialty newspapers serve the U.S. Congress; most notable are Roll Call and The Hill.

Television
The metro area is served by several local broadcast television stations and is the eighth largest designated market area in the U.S., with 2,252,550 homes (2.04% of the U.S. population). Major television network affiliates include WRC 4 (NBC), WTTG 5 (Fox), WJLA 7 (ABC), WUSA 9 (CBS), WDCA 20 (MyNetwork TV) and WDCW 50 (The CW) as well as WETA 26 and WHUT 32 (PBS) stations. Channels 4 and 5 are Owned-and-operated stations. Public Access on Cable Television is provided by the Public Access Corporation of the District of Columbia on two channels simulcast to both local cable TV Systems. One channel is devoted to religious programming and the other channel provides a diversity of offerings. A regional news station, News Channel 8, is carried on Channel 8 on all cable systems in Washington, D.C. and surrounding communities. Additionally, most Baltimore area television stations can be seen in the Washington region. Besides being viewed clearly in the District, they can especially be seen in the suburbs of the Interstate 95 corridor between both cities. They are:

WMAR 2 (ABC) – WBAL 11 (NBC) – WJZ 13 (CBS) – WMJF 16 (Ind/MTV2) – WMPT 22 / WMPB 67 (PBS/MPB) – WUTB 24 (MyNetwork TV) – WBFF 45 (FOX) – WNUV 54 (The CW) (The Tube on DT2)

Spanish-language television is also represented by Telemundo WZDC-LP 25 and Telefutura affiliate WMDO-CA 47, but these are low-power television stations limited to within the Capital Beltway area. Univision's WFDC 14, however, transmits as a full power station and can be received as far north as Baltimore.

Incidentally, D.C's Univision and Telefutura stations (owned by Entravision) switched call letters on January 1, 2006; meaning that now Univision is the only Spanish station which can be seen at full power over the whole Washington metropolitan area. The Univision network moved from low-powered Channel 47/WMDO to full-powered Channel 14/WFDC; Univision's youth-oriented Telefutura network moved from 14 to 47. The change caused Univision and Telefutura to exchange channel locations on D.C. area cable TV systems, too.

Azteca America announced they would start transmitting from a new full powered Spanish-language broadcast affiliate in the region, Channel 69/WQAW-LD on October 6, 2006, as well as its addition to local channel lineups for Comcast Cable. However it has not been seen on the air as of yet. Earliest reports from viewers do not indicate availability of its broadcasts inside the District, as far south as Prince William County, Virginia, or as far north as the Columbia/Baltimore area.

Several cable television networks have their headquarters in the Washington area including C-SPAN on Capitol Hill, Black Entertainment Television (BET) in Northeast Washington, and Discovery Communications in Silver Spring, Maryland, as well as the Public Broadcasting Service (PBS) in Alexandria, Virginia. Major national broadcasters and cable outlets including NBC, ABC, CBS, FOX, and CNN maintain a significant presence in Washington, as do those from around the world including the BBC, CBC, and Al Jazeera. America's Most Wanted is the only network primetime program produced in Washington.

Radio

There are several major radio stations serving the metro area, with a wide variety of musical interests. Contemporary music Station (and arguably the most popular) is WIHT 99.5 FM (Hot 99.5) located in Rockville, Maryland. Rock stations include WTGB 94.7 FM (Triple A) and WWDC 101.1 FM (alternative rock/pop). Urban stations include WPGC 95.5 FM (rhythmic top 40/urban contemporary), WHUR 96.3 FM (Howard University urban adult contemporary station), WMMJ 102.3 FM (urban adult contemporary), WKYS 93.9 FM (urban contemporary), and Radio CPR 97.5 FM (a popular pirate radio station broadcasting in the area around Mount Pleasant, Adams Morgan, and Columbia Heights). Two major contemporary Christian music stations in the region are WGTS 91.9 FM (of Takoma Park) and WPIR 89.9 (of Warrenton, Virginia). Stations that concentrate on talk and sports include WJFK 106.7 FM, WSBN 630 AM (ESPN Radio), WQOF 1260 AM (progressive talk), WOL 1450 AM, WPGC 1580 AM (gospel), WTEM 980 AM (sports talk), WAVA 105.1 FM (Christian talk radio), WTOP 103.5 FM (news), and WWWT 1500 AM/107.7 FM (3WT/talk). Radio duos Don and Mike and Ron and Fez both had great success on WJFK, although the latter now broadcast on D.C.-based XM Satellite Radio via the network's New York studio.

The Sports Junkies is a popular sports talk radio show on 106.7 FM. The show's hosts John Auville, Eric Bickel, Jason Bishop, and John-Paul Flaim, are life-long friends and have been working together on the show since 1996. The show is on weekdays from 6am to 10am.

WOL 1450 AM, WKYS 93.9 FM, and WMMJ 102.3 are owned by Washington's Radio One, the largest African American media conglomerate in the country. It was founded by Cathy Hughes, a prominent figure in Washington radio since her days at Howard University's WHUR.

There are two National Public Radio (NPR) affiliates: WAMU 88.5 FM (NPR and Public Radio International programming, community programming, and BBC news), broadcast from the American University, and WETA 90.9 FM (around-the-clock classical music). Other stations include WASH 97.1 FM (adult contemporary), WMZQ-FM 98.7 FM (country music), WBIG 100.3 FM (classic hits), Triple X ESPN Radio 92.7 FM/94.3 FM/730 AM (sports talk station controlled by Washington Commanders owner Daniel Snyder), WLZL El Zol 99.1 FM (Latin/Tropical), WPRS-FM Praise 104.1 (gospel), WPFW 89.3 FM (jazz and progressive talk), WJZW 105.9 FM (smooth jazz), and WLVW 107.3 FM (Christian contemporary). Additionally, most major radio stations from Baltimore can be heard in the Washington metropolitan area.

XM Satellite Radio and NPR are based in Washington. The Voice of America, the U.S. government's international broadcasting service, is headquartered in Washington.

LGBT community

D.C. has a notable and diverse LGBT culture. Dupont Circle has historically been the epicenter of LGBT culture in D.C. Since 1986, on the Tuesday before Halloween, the High Heel Drag Queen Race is held.

Latino community

The Latino community in Washington, D.C. is one of the most thriving and fastest growing ones in the nation. The Mayor's Office has a division for the Latino community called OLA (the Office of Latino Affairs).

There are several medical centers that cater to the needs of the Spanish-speaking population. Also, there are about six newspapers in Spanish and various bilingual schools. Most government programs and facilities provide services in Spanish. The transportation system like Metro and buses offer information (e.g. brochures and announcements) in English and Spanish. There are many centers that offer services in Spanish and have special programs for the Latino community such as the Whitman-Walker Clinic, the Office of Human Services of the District of Columbia, most hospitals offer bilingual services including translators and bilingual staff on call twenty-four hours a day.

Latin music is heard all across the city (supermarkets, Starbucks, restaurants, etc.) Bilingual staff can be found in most supermarkets, pharmacies, restaurants, laundromats, etc.

Spanish is the second most spoken language in the city after English, and most government city programs publish and advertise in English and Spanish among other languages. Cultural programs and events for the Latino community thrive all across the city, including frequent concerts by top Latin music artists such as Juanes, Shakira, Alejandro Fernández, Juan Gabriel, and Ricky Martin. There is also a theater company called Gala, which presents plays all year round.

The metropolitan area of Washington, D.C. has the largest population of Salvadorans in the world after San Salvador. Also, there are communities from Peru, Guatemala, Honduras, Colombia, and other Latin American countries. Most universities and colleges in the area have Spanish and Latino representatives for the recruitment of Latino students. Furthermore, there are many organizations that foster the educational and professional needs of young Latino students, such as the Latin American Youth Center. There are also programs for Latinos who suffer from substance abuse, including AYUDA.

The Latino Federation of Greater Washington gathers the largest group of Latino organizations in the area and Latino serving populations programs in the region. Additionally, all Latin American countries have diplomatic representation in Washington, D.C., including Cuba. The World Bank, The InterAmerican Development Bank, The International Monetary Fund, and the Organization of American States have clubs, associations, and committees that gather Latinos from many countries and regions.

 Health: as Mary's Center, Columbia Heights Clinic, and La Clinica del Pueblo. Some hospitals like the Washington Hospital Center,  Howard University Hospitals, The George Washington University Hospital provide services in Spanish.
 Education: Oyster Elementary school, Bell Multicultural High School and Carlos Rosario International Public Charter School.
 Higher Education: George Washington University, Howard University, Georgetown University, Gallaudet University, The University of Maryland, College Park.
 Government agencies: OLA, Office of Latino Affairs.
 Entertainment: Spanish theater company GALA, Washington, D.C. Univision, Telemundo, radio Viva.
 Newspapers: The Washington Hispanic, El Pregonero, El Tiempo.
 Supermarkets: Whole Foods (bilingual staff), and Latino products, Panam, and Bestway.
 Neighborhoods: Although Latinas/os can be found all across the city, high rent and gentrification programs have pushed them further and further out of the city, but there are some areas where their concentration is highly noticeable like Adams Morgan, Bloomingdale, Columbia Heights, Georgia Avenue and Petworth, Shaw, and all across NorthEast.
 Senior Latinas/os: EUFULA.
 Lifestyle: in addition to having one of the largest concentration of Latinos in the country, Latinos from the LGBT community are widely represented. Many associations, night clubs, restaurants, cafes, and stores cater to their needs and/or dedicate a day or night to cater to this sub-community all across the city. Famous are the one Saturday night clubs such as Fuego (location varies) which are famous in the city. This program/event can congregate over 1,000 LGBT Latinas/os per night. Several publications advertise and promote services and programs for the Latino LGBT community.

References

External links
Ghosts of DC - local DC history blog
Greater Greater Washington - local DC blog
Washingtonian
DCist

 
American culture
Cultural history of the United States